The 2006 Southern Miss Golden Eagles football team represented the University of Southern Mississippi in the 2006 NCAA Division I FBS football season. The Golden Eagles were led by head coach Jeff Bower and played their home games at M. M. Roberts Stadium. They are a member of the East Division of Conference USA.

Schedule

References

Southern Miss
Southern Miss Golden Eagles football seasons
LendingTree Bowl champion seasons
Southern Miss Golden Eagles football